The following outline is provided as an overview of and topical guide to the canon law of the Catholic Church:
Catholic canon law is the set of rules and principles (laws) by which the Catholic Church is governed, through enforcement by governmental authorities.  Law is also the field which concerns the creation and administration of laws.

Current law
1983 Code of Canon Law
Omnium in mentem
Magnum principium
Code of Canons of the Eastern Churches
Ad tuendam fidem
Ex corde Ecclesiae
Indulgentiarum Doctrina
Pastor bonus
Pontificalis Domus
Veritatis gaudium
Custom

Legal history
1917 Code of Canon Law

Corpus Juris Canonici
Decretist
Regulæ Juris
Decretals of Gregory IX
Decretalist
Decretum Gratiani
Extravagantes
Liber Septimus

Ancient Church Orders
Didache
The Apostolic Constitutions
Canons of the Apostles

Collections of ancient canons
Collectiones canonum Dionysianae
Collectio canonum quadripartita
Collectio canonum Quesnelliana
Collectio canonum Wigorniensis

Other
Pseudo-Isidorian Decretals
Benedictus Deus (Pius IV)
Contractum trinius
Defect of birth
Jus exclusivae
Papal appointment
Right of option

Eastern Catholic canon law 
Code of Canons of the Eastern Churches
Eastern Canonical Reforms of Pius XII
Nomocanon
Archeparchy
Eparchy

Liturgical law
Ecclesia Dei
Mysterii Paschalis
Sacrosanctum concilium
Musicam sacram
Summorum Pontificum
Tra le sollecitudini

Sacramental law
Communicatio in sacris
Ex opere operato
Omnium in mentem
Valid but illicit

Holy Orders
Impediment
Abstemius
Clerical celibacy
Nullity of Sacred Ordination
Apostolicae curae
Dimissorial letters
Approbation

Confession 
Apostolic Penitentiary
Complicit absolution
Canon penitentiary
Internal and external forum
Paenitentiale Theodori
Penitential canons
Seal of the Confessional

Eucharist 
Eucharistic discipline
Canon 915

Matrimonial law
Banns of Marriage
Declaration of Nullity
Matrimonial Nullity Trial Reforms of Pope Francis
Defender of the Bond
Natural marriage

Impediments to marriage
Affinity
Bigamy
Clandestinity
Impediment of crime
Disparity of cult
Ligamen
Public propriety

Matrimonial dispensation
Ratum sed non consummatum
Sanatio in radice
Pauline privilege
Petrine privilege

Trials and tribunals
Tribunals
Supreme Tribunal of the Apostolic Signatura
Tribunal of the Roman Rota
Apostolic Penitentiary

Tribunal officers
Judicial Vicar/Officialis
Auditor
Advocatus Diaboli
Defender of the Bond

Tribunal procedure
Appeal as from an abuse
Presumption

Canonical structures

Particular churches
Particular churches sui juris
Latin Church
Eastern Catholic Churches
Local particular churches
Abbacy nullius
Abbot nullius
Apostolic vicariate
Apostolic vicar
Apostolic administration
Apostolic administrator
Archdiocese
Diocese
Aeque principaliter
Cathedraticum
In persona episcopi
Chancery
Deanery
Vicar forane
Archeparchy
Eparchy
Military ordinariate
Mission sui juris
Personal ordinariate
Anglicanorum Coetibus

Juridic persons
Parish
Roman Curia
Dicastery
Congregation
Pontifical council
Personal Prelature

Jurisprudence
Benefice
Canonical coronation
Canonically crowned images
Computation of time
Contract law
Custom
Delegata potestas non potest delegari
Derogation
Dispensation
Taxa Innocentiana
Indult
Impediment
Interpretation
Pontifical Council for Legislative Texts
Jurisdiction
Peritus
Obreption & subreption
Obrogation
Promulgation
Resignation of the Roman Pontiff
Sede vacante
Vacatio legis
Valid but illicit

Philosophy, theology, and fundamental theory of Catholic canon law 
Theology
Ecclesiology
Treatise on Law
Determinatio

Law of persons 
Person (Catholic canon law)
Canonical age
Canonical faculties (Catholic canon law)
Clerics and public office
Clerical celibacy
Consecrated life
Defect of birth
Emancipation
Juridic & physical persons
Jus patronatus
Laicization (dispensation)

Canonical documents
Acta Apostolicae Sedis
Acta Sanctae Sedis
Notary (Catholic canon law)
Protonotary apostolic
Apostolic constitution
Canon
Concordat
Decree
Decretal
Encyclical
Motu proprio
Ordinance
Papal brief
Papal bull
Penitential
Positive law
Rescript

Penal law
Canon 1324
Canon 1397 §2
Censure (canon law)
Excommunication
List of excommunicable offences in the Catholic Church
List of people excommunicated by the Catholic Church
List of cardinals excommunicated by the Catholic Church
Interdict
Internal and external forum
Laicization (penal)
Latae sententiae
Ferendae sententiae
 Lifetime of prayer and penance

Procedural law
Election of the Roman Pontiff
Universi Dominici gregis
Papal renunciation

Academic degrees
Licentiate of Canon Law
Doctor of Canon Law 
Doctor Juris Utriusque

See also

Catholic canon law
Catholic canon law

canon